Lay presidency is a form of celebrating the Lord's Supper (sometimes called the Eucharist) whereby the person presiding over the sacrament is not an ordained minister of religion. Similarly, when the celebrant is a deacon rather than a presbyter, the term diaconal presidency is used.

Use
Most independent Christian churches have a form of lay presidency as part of their communal worship. Mainstream denominations have been less inclined to allow lay people to preside over the sacrament, preferring to use ordained ministers or priests for this role.

Denominations which use lay presidency
In the United Methodist Church lay presidency is the norm. While many are ordained as presbyters (Elders) most clergy in the UMC are commissioned or licensed local pastors. These laypersons while called clergy in the Book of Discipline are nonetheless not ordained. These lay persons are only allowed to celebrate the sacraments in their appointments.

Theological considerations
One area of conflict for Evangelical Christians in mainline churches is that, while the sacrament is a symbolic preaching of the gospel, only authorized and ordained ministers may preside, whereas non-ordained people are not allowed to do this, despite being allowed to preach the gospel in some cases. This may be seen as elevating the importance of the sacrament over the preaching of the gospel - that the symbolic preaching is more important than the literal. Evangelical elements in some mainline churches, for example the Diocese of Sydney within the Anglican Church of Australia, are considering introducing lay presidency due to this.

North American Lutheran view
The Evangelical Lutheran Church in America and Evangelical Lutheran Church in Canada authorise lay and diaconal presidency in certain extraordinary circumstances, within a finite time period and location. In some Lutheran churches, seminarians will celebrate the Lord's Supper prior to their eventual ordination. This expresses official church teaching against the concepts of apostolic succession and the idea that ordination leaves an indelible character, without which sacraments would be invalid.

References

Eucharist
Ecclesiology